Éric Angelvy (Saint-Ouen, 11 November 1968) is a French former racing driver.

On retirement from racing Angelvy went into restaurant management, and has run several Parisian restaurants including Makoto, 912, Mustang Café, House of Live ex-Chesterfield Café.

References

1968 births
Living people
French racing drivers
International Formula 3000 drivers
French businesspeople
People from Saint-Ouen-sur-Seine
Sportspeople from Seine-Saint-Denis